The 2011 Census of India or the 15th Indian Census was conducted in two phases, house listing and population enumeration. The House listing phase began on 1 April 2010 and involved the collection of information about all buildings. Information for National Population Register (NPR) was also collected in the first phase, which will be used to issue a 12-digit unique identification number to all registered Indian residents by Unique Identification Authority of India. The second population enumeration phase was conducted between 9 and 28 February 2011. Census has been conducted in India since 1872 and 2011 marks the first time biometric information was collected. According to the provisional reports released on 31 March 2011, the Indian population increased to 1.21 billion with a decadal growth of 17.70%. Adult literacy rate increased to 74.04% with a decadal growth of 9.21%. The motto of the census was 'Our Census, Our future'.

Spread across 28 states and 8 union territories, the census covered 640 districts, 5,924 sub-districts, 7,935 towns and more than 600,000 villages. A total of 2.7 million officials visited households in 7,935 towns and 600,000 villages, classifying the population according to gender, religion, education and occupation. The cost of the exercise was approximately  – this comes to less than $0.50 per person, well below the estimated world average of $4.60 per person. Conducted every 10 years, this census faced big challenges considering India's vast area and diversity of cultures and opposition from the manpower involved.

Information on castes was included in the census following demands from several ruling coalition leaders including Lalu Prasad Yadav, and Mulayam Singh Yadav supported by opposition parties Bharatiya Janata Party, Akali Dal, Shiv Sena and Anna Dravida Munnetra Kazhagam. Information on caste was last collected during the British Raj in 1931. During the early census, people often exaggerated their caste status to garner social status and it is expected that people downgrade it now in the expectation of gaining government benefits. Earlier, There was speculation that there would be a caste-based census conducted in 2011, the first time for 80 years (last was in 1931), to find the exact population of the "Other Backward Classes" (OBCs) in India. This was later accepted and the Socio Economic and Caste Census 2011 was conducted whose first findings were revealed on 3 July 2015 by Union Finance Minister Arun Jaitley. Mandal Commission report of 1980 quoted OBC population at 52%, though National Sample Survey Organisation (NSSO) survey of 2006 quoted OBC population at 41%.

There is only one instance of a caste count in post-independence India. It was conducted in Kerala in 1968 by the Government of Kerala under E. M. S. Namboodiripad to assess the social and economic backwardness of various lower castes. The census was termed Socio-Economic Survey of 1968 and the results were published in the Gazetteer of Kerala, 1971.

History
C. M. Chandramauli was the Registrar General and Census Commissioner of India for the 2011 Indian Census. Census data was collected in 16 languages and the training manual was prepared in 18 languages. In 2011, India and Bangladesh also conducted their first-ever joint census of areas along their border. The census was conducted in two phases. The first, the house-listing phase, began on 1 April 2010 and involved collection of data about all the buildings and census houses. Information for the National Population Register was also collected in the first phase. The second, the population enumeration phase, was conducted from 9 – 28 February 2011 all over the country. The eradication of epidemics, the availability of more effective medicines for the treatment of various types of diseases and the improvement in the standard of living were the main reasons for the high decadal growth of population in India.

Information

House-listings
The House-listing schedule contained 35 questions.

Population enumeration
The Population enumeration schedule contained 30 questions.

National Population Register
The National Population Register household schedule contained 9 questions.

Once the information was collected and digitised, fingerprints were taken and photos collected. Unique Identification Authority of India was to issue a 12-digit identification number to all individuals and the first ID have been issued in 2011.

Census report

Provisional data from the census was released on 31 March 2011 (and was updated on 20 May 2013). Transgender population was counted in population census in India for the first time in 2011. The overall sex ratio of the population is 940 females for every 1,000 males in 2011. The official count of the third gender in India is 490,000

Population
India added 181.5 million to its population since 2001, slightly lower than the population of Brazil. India, with 2.4% of the world's surface area, accounts for 17.5% of its population. Uttar Pradesh is the most populous state with roughly 200 million people. Over half the population resided in the six most populous states of Uttar Pradesh, Maharashtra, Bihar, West Bengal, Andhra Pradesh and Madhya Pradesh. Of the 1.21 billion Indians, 833 million (68.84%) live in rural areas while 377 million stay in urban areas. 453.6 million people in India are migrants, which is 37.8% of total population.

India is home to many religions such as Hinduism, Islam, Buddhism, Sikhism and Jainism, while also being home to several indigenous faiths and tribal religions which have been practiced alongside major religions for centuries. According to the 2011 census, the total number of households in India is 248.8 million. Of which 202.4 million are Hindu, 31.2 million are Muslim, 6.3 million are Christian, 4.1 million are Sikh, and 1.9 million are Jain According to 2011 census, there are around 3.01 million places of worship in India.

Ever since its inception, the Census of India has been collecting and publishing information about the religious affiliations as expressed by the people of India. In fact, population census has the rare distinction of being the only instrument that collects this diverse and important characteristic of the Indian population.

Religious demographics 
The religious data on India Census 2011 was released by the Government of India on 25 August 2015. Hindus are 79.8% (966.3 million) while Sikhs are 20.8 million comprising 1.72% of the population, Muslims are 14.23% (172.2 million) in India. and Christians are 2.30% (28.7 million). According to the 2011 Census of India, there are 57,264 Parsis in India. For the first time, a "No religion" category was added in the 2011 census. 2.87 million were classified as people belonging to "No Religion" in India in the 2011 census 0.24% of India's population of 1.21 billion. Given below is the decade-by-decade religious composition of India until the 2011 census. There are six religions in India that have been awarded "National Minority" status – Muslims, Christians, Sikhs, Jains, Buddhists and Parsis. Sunnis, Shias, Bohras, Agakhanis and Ahmadiyyas were identified as sects of Islam in India. As per 2011 census, six major faiths- Hindus, Muslims, Christians, Sikhs, Buddhists, Jains make up over 99.4% of India's 1.21 billion population, while "other religions, persuasions" (ORP) count is 8.2 million. Among the ORP faiths, six faiths- 4.957 million-strong Sarnaism, 1.026 million-strong Gond, 506,000-strong Sari, Donyi-Polo (302,000) in Arunachal Pradesh, Sanamahism (222,000) in Manipur, Khasi (138,000) in Meghalaya dominate. Maharashtra is having the highest number of non-religious in the country with 9,652 such people, followed by Kerala.

Population trends for major religious groups in India (1951–2011)

Language demographics

Hindi is the most widely spoken language in northern parts of India. The Indian census takes the widest possible definition of "Hindi" as a broad variety of "Hindi languages". According to 2011 Census, 57.1% of Indian population know Hindi, in which 43.63% of Indian people have declared Hindi as their native language or mother tongue. The language data was released on 26 June 2018. Bhili/Bhilodi was the most spoken unscheduled language with 10.4 million speakers, followed by Gondi with 2.9 million speakers. 96.71% of India's population speaks one of the 22 scheduled languages as their mother tongue in the 2011 census.

The 2011 census report on bilingualism and trilingualism, which provides data on the two languages in order of preference in which a person is proficient other than the mother tongue, was released in September 2018. The number of bilingual speakers in India is 314.9 million, which is 26% of the population in 2011. 7% of Indian population is trilingual. Hindi, Bengali speakers are India's least multilingual groups.

Numbers regarding languages spoken available in the 2011 Indian Census data may not reflect actual data in India due to how the data was collected, with participants being allowed to give any response they wished for what languages they spoke.

Literacy
Any individual above age 7 who can read and write in any language with an ability to understand was considered literate. In censuses before 1991, children below the age 5 were treated as illiterates. The literacy rate taking the entire population into account is termed as "crude literacy rate", and taking the population from age 7 and above into account is termed as "effective literacy rate". Effective literacy rate increased to a total of 74.04% with 82.14% of the males and 65.46% of the females being literate.

 The table lists the "effective literacy rate" in India from 1901 to 2011.

See also

 Socio Economic and Caste Census 2011
 Demography of India
 Irreligion in India
 Scheduled Castes and Scheduled Tribes
 Other Backward Class

Notes

References

External links

 Census of India Official Website
 Cities having population 1 lakh and above, Census 2011
 

Census of India, 2011
Censuses in India
Political history of India
Manmohan Singh administration
India